Lubang may refer to:

 Lubang Island, an island in the Philippines
 Lubang, Occidental Mindoro, a municipality on Lubang Island
 Lubang Buaya, a suburb of Jakarta, Indonesia